Abdellatif Berbich FAAS (17 May 1942–1 January 2015) was a professor of internal medicine. He was the founding Chairman of the nephrology Moroccan company, Permanent Secretary of the Academy of the Kingdom of Morocco, and Morocco's ambassador to Algiers.

Education 
Berbich was born in Fez, Morocco on 17 May 1934. He attended Moulay Youssef and Gouraud high schools for his secondary education. He obtained a doctorate in medicine in 1961 from the University of Montpellier. Between 1962 and 1964 he pursued a specialty in Nephrology and medical resuscitation at the University Hospital Center of Paris (Hospital Necker).

Career 
In 1967, Berbich was an associate professor of medicine at the University of Rabat and in 1968  he became the chief physician of Ibn Sina-Avicenne hospital. In the same year, he was appointed as the Dean of the Faculty of Medicine of the University of Rabat up until 1974. In 1982 he became the permanent secretary of the Kingdom of Morocco and in 1988 he became the ambassador of Morocco in Algiers.

In October 1968 he became the first Director of Kidney transplant in Morocco and in 1973 he created the first chronic hemodialysis in Morocco.

Fellowship and membership 
Berbich was elected a Fellow of the African Academy of Sciences in 1986. He is a Founding member of the Moroccan associations of medical sciences and nephrology, a Member of French and international Nephrology associations, the French National Association of Internal Medicine, and the French National Academy of medicine.

Awards and honours 
Berbich was awarded Hassi Beida Medal and Star of War award in 1963, the Commander of the Royal Victorian Order in 1987, Commander of the French Order of Arts and Letters in 1989, the Commander of the Order of the Throne of Morocco in 1989, and the Commander of the Legion of Honor 2000. He was also awarded the Commander of the Order of Merit in Spain, Germany, Denmark, Italy, Portugal and  Senegal.

He was awarded posthumously the Throne medal, Great officer of Morocco in 2015.

Death 
Berbich died in Rabat, Morocco on 1 January 2015, aged 80, and was buried in Martyrs' Cemetery.

See also 

 Faïrouz Malek
 Farida Fassi

References 

Moroccan medical doctors
1934 births
2015 deaths
Fellows of the African Academy of Sciences
Moroccan physicians